Barot is a surname. Notable people with the surname include:

Chandra Barot, Indian film director
Dhiren Barot (born 1971), convicted terrorist in the United Kingdom
Kamal Barot, Indian female playback singer
Miraj Barot (born 1988), Indian-born Ugandan business executive
Pradeep Barot (born 1953), Indian maestro
Ranjit Barot (born before 1995), Indian film score composer
Jayantilal Barot (born 1942), Member of the Parliament of India